Borghetto Lodigiano is a comune (municipality) in the Province of Lodi in the Italian region Lombardy, located about  southeast of Milan and about  south of Lodi. It is located on the left slope of the Lambro river.

Borghetto Lodigiano borders the following municipalities: Ossago Lodigiano, Villanova del Sillaro, Brembio, Graffignana, Livraga, San Colombano al Lambro. The economy is mostly based on agriculture and on production of aluminium.

References

External links
 Official website

Cities and towns in Lombardy